Tom Kelly is a former Gaelic footballer from County Laois.

His club is St Joseph's. He usually played at centre back for Laois and in 2003 won an All Stars Award and was part of the Laois team that won the Leinster Senior Football Championship title for the first time since 1946.

Kelly twice travelled to Australia for the International Rules Series, where he was Ireland's player of the series in 2005.

With St Joseph's, Kelly picked up two Laois Senior Football Championship medals.

In January 2011, Kelly was forced to retire due to a neck injury he sustained the year before.

Honours
Club
Laois Senior Football Championship (2): 1996, 2000
Laois All-County Football League (2): 2001, 2010

Inter-county
Leinster Senior Football Championship (1): 2003
Leinster Under-21 Football Championship (1): 1998
All-Ireland Minor Football Championship (1): 1997
Leinster Minor Football Championship (1): 1997

Individual
All Star (1): 2003
International Rules Series Player of the Series (1): 2005

References

Year of birth missing (living people)
Living people
All Stars Awards winners (football)
Irish international rules football players
Irish schoolteachers
Laois inter-county Gaelic footballers
St Joseph's (Laois) Gaelic footballers